Leslie Canyon National Wildlife Refuge is a National Wildlife Refuge of the United States located in Arizona. The  refuge was established in 1988 to protect habitat for the endangered Yaqui Chub (Gila purpurea) and Yaqui Topminnow (Poeciliopsis occidentalis sonorensis). The refuge also protects a rare velvet ash-cottonwood-black walnut gallery forest.

This area is part of the basin and range geologic region, characterized by linear mountain ranges which are separated by broad, flat basins. The region was impacted by relatively recent volcanic activity, leaving volcanic plugs and cinder cones visible throughout the San Bernardino Valley. Earthquakes have further altered the region and helped allow the flow of many springs and seeps. All of these dynamic geological events have played major roles in shaping the valley, catching and storing crucial water, helping determine the variety of plants and animals present.

The San Bernardino Valley once supported permanently flowing creeks, springs, and marshy wetlands. In addition, the giant sacaton grassland in the valley was once described as "a luxuriant meadow some eight or ten miles long and a mile wide." The dependable source of water and grass made the area not only invaluable to a huge diversity of fish and wildlife, but also a center of human activity for centuries.

With expanding settlement beginning in the late 19th century came farming, mining, and livestock production, all of which competed for the same precious water. While the extensive wetlands here once provided historic habitat for eight different kinds of native fish, the lowering water table led to severe changes in the habitat and the eventual local extinctions of many species.

References
 Leslie Canyon National Wildlife Refuge. United States Fish and Wildlife Service.

Protected areas of Cochise County, Arizona
National Wildlife Refuges in Arizona
Protected areas established in 1988
1988 establishments in Arizona